Edward Taylor Pegg Jr. (born December 7, 1963) is an expert on mathematical puzzles and is a self-described recreational mathematician. He wrote an online puzzle column called Ed Pegg Jr.'s Math Games for the Mathematical Association of America during the years 2003–2007. His puzzles have also been used by Will Shortz on the puzzle segment of NPR's Weekend Edition Sunday. He was a fan of Martin Gardner and regularly participated in Gathering 4 Gardner conferences. In 2009 he teamed up with Tom M. Rodgers and Alan Schoen to edit two Gardner tribute books.

Pegg received a master's degree in mathematics from the University of Colorado at Colorado Springs, writing his thesis on the subject of fair dice. In 2000, he left NORAD to join Wolfram Research, where he collaborated on A New Kind of Science (NKS). In 2004 he started assisting Eric W. Weisstein at Wolfram MathWorld. He has made contributions to several hundred MathWorld articles. He was one of the chief consultants for Numb3rs.

References

External links

MathPuzzle
Ed Pegg Jr.'s Math Games 
Demonstrations by Ed Pegg Jr.
The Math Behind Numb3rs
CBS puzzle
 Ed Pegg Jr.'s entry in the Numericana Hall of Fame

1963 births
20th-century American mathematicians
21st-century American mathematicians
Cellular automatists
Living people
Puzzle designers
Recreational mathematicians
Mathematics popularizers
Pegg Edward